Andrea Aiuti (17 June 1849 – 28 April 1905) was an Italian prelate of the Catholic Church who worked in the diplomatic service of the Holy See and in the Roman Curia. He was made a cardinal in 1903.

Biography
Andrea Aiuti was born in Rome on 17 June 1849 to a patrician family from Trapani. He earned degrees in philosophy and theology at the Pontifical Roman Athenaeum Saint Apollinare.

He was ordained a priest on 22 September 1871. 

Aiuti was a member of the Roman Curia on the staff of the Congregation of the Council and then in the diplomatic service at the nunciature in Brazil. He was secretary to Antonio Agliardi who was charged with organizing the Church in India.  On 31 March 1887 he was appointed titular archbishop of Achrida and Apostolic Delegate to India. He received his episcopal ordination from the Archbishop of Bombay, George Porter, S.J., on 1 May 1887. He published an account of his years in India in English as a guide for the Catholic hierarchy there.

From 1891 to 1893 he was secretary for Eastern Rite affairs at the Congregation for the Propagation of the Faith. In that role he contributed to Pope Leo XIII's encyclical on the union of the Christian churches, Satis cognitum (1896).

He was appointed Apostolic Nuncio to Bavaria on 7 June 1893. A few days later he was appointed Titular Archbishop of Tamiathis. On 15 July 1896 he became Apostolic Nuncio to Portugal.

On 12 November 1903, Pope Leo XIII made him cardinal-priest of San Girolamo dei Croati.

Aiuti participated in the conclave of 1903 that elected Pope Pius X.

He died after a long illness surrounded by his relatives in Rome on 28 April 1905 at the age of 55. He was buried in the family vault in Rome's Campo Verano cemetery.

References

External links

 Catholic-hierarchy.org 

Apostolic Nuncios to India
Apostolic Nuncios to Portugal
Officials of the Roman Curia
20th-century Italian cardinals
1849 births
1905 deaths
Burials at Campo Verano
19th-century Italian Roman Catholic archbishops
Cardinals created by Pope Leo XIII